Ceardach is a small uninhabited island in Loch Lomond, in west central Scotland. The island lies east of Bucinch and north of Inchcruin. The name Ceardach means a smithy.

History 
Ceardach may have been the site of an Iron Age bloomery or furnace for smelting iron ore.

Along with neighbour, Bucinch, the island, was donated to the National Trust for Scotland by Col. Charles L. Spencer of Warmanbie, Dumfries, in 1943.

Flora 
A large variety of trees and other plants grow on the island, from seeds brought by birds, wind and water. There is a mature if stunted oak tree, willow, holly, briar, and bramble.

References

External links 
 

Islands of Loch Lomond
National Trust for Scotland properties
Iron Age sites in Scotland
Uninhabited islands of Stirling (council area)